In Greek mythology, Polydamas (Ancient Greek: Πολυδάμας, gen. Πολυδάμαντος, Polydámas, Polydámantos) was a lieutenant and friend of Hector during the Trojan War.

Family 
Polydamas was the son of Panthous, one of the Trojan elders and Phrontis. He was the father of Leocritus who was killed by Odysseus.

Mythology 
During the battles described in the Iliad, he often proposes a cautious battle strategy which is sometimes accepted but more often refused by Hector, who prefers direct attack. In Book XII, he prefers retreat in the face of the omen of an eagle. Hector defies this and presses forth anyway. However, Hector does take his advice to regroup in Book XIII, after the Argives have done tremendous damage to the Trojans. In Book XVIII of the Iliad, Polydamas advises the Trojans to retire from the battlefield after the death of Patroclus. Hector, however, overrules Polydamas, leaving the army in the field when Achilles ends his feud with Agamemnon and rejoins the Achaean forces. As a result, Achilles kills a great number of Trojan warriors, culminating in a duel with Hector in which the latter is killed.

Polydamas appears periodically throughout the battles, and brags about killing Prothoënor. He often complements Hector in battle. In Book XV, after killing Mecistus and Otus, he is attacked by Meges, but Apollo saves him, causing him to dodge at the last moment.  Polydamas killed three Greeks in the war.

Homer gives no foreshadowing of Polydamas's final fate, nor is he mentioned in most of the later poems dealing with the aftermath of the war, leaving the reader to infer that he perished in the general slaughter after the fall of Troy to the Greek forces. 

He is mentioned in Quintus Smyrnaeus' Posthomerica, but again, no death is mentioned. In Quintus Smyrneaus' story, Polydamas actually suggests that instead of attacking or fleeing, the Trojans should just give Helen back to the Greeks. This suggestion is well received by many soldiers, but nobody admits it. Paris calls him a deserter and a coward, but Polydamas retorts that Paris' ambitions instigated the problem. Later on, he tries again to persuade the Trojans to stay inside the city in order to raise troop morale, but it is Aeneas that opposes his opinion this time, on the grounds that the Greeks will not be disheartened by a long stay inside the walls.

References 
Notes

Bibliography
 Gaius Julius Hyginus, Fabulae from The Myths of Hyginus translated and edited by Mary Grant. University of Kansas Publications in Humanistic Studies. Online version at the Topos Text Project.
 Pausanias, Description of Greece with an English Translation by W.H.S. Jones, Litt.D., and H.A. Ormerod, M.A., in 4 Volumes. Cambridge, MA, Harvard University Press; London, William Heinemann Ltd. 1918. . Online version at the Perseus Digital Library
 Pausanias, Graeciae Descriptio. 3 vols. Leipzig, Teubner. 1903.  Greek text available at the Perseus Digital Library.

External links

Trojans
Characters in the Iliad